Dumblonde (stylized dumblonde) is an American alternative dance pop duo consisting of Danity Kane members Shannon Bex and Aubrey O'Day.

History

2014–2016: Danity Kane split, formation of Dumblonde and debut album
On August 4, 2014, while in a Los Angeles recording studio, a fight ensued in which fellow Danity Kane member Dawn Richard allegedly punched O'Day. After days of speculation, O'Day and Bex released a public statement on August 8 announcing the group's second disbandment.

On September 24, 2014, O'Day and Bex announced that despite the group's break-up, their third album, DK3, would be released on October 28, 2014.

After the split of Danity Kane, Aubrey O'Day and Shannon Bex decided to make alternative dance pop music as a duo. On March 29, 2015, O'Day and Bex announced the name of their group: Dumblonde. The group's self-entitled album was released on September 25, 2015. Peaking at #1 on the Billboard U.S Heatseekers Chart. To promote the album, they performed at small venues and gay pride festivals across the United States.

2017–present: White Hot Lies and reuniting with Danity Kane 
In 2018, Bex and O'Day announced the lead single from their untitled second album entitled White Hot Lies to be released July 4, 2018. After releasing White Hot Lies in the summer of 2018 the ladies announced that they would be touring with Danity Kane again to promote the new album's from both dumblonde and Dawn Richard. The tour would include music from Dawn's solo work, Dumblonde's album as well as music from Danity Kane the tour began September 28, 2018 in Stamford, Connecticut and ended on March 2, 2019 in Seattle Washington.

Discography

Albums

Singles

Music videos

Notes

References

External links

 

American pop music duos
Musical groups established in 2015
American dance music groups
American Internet celebrities
2015 establishments in California
Female musical duos